Vocational discernment is the process by which men and women in the Catholic Church discern, or recognize, their vocation in the church and the world. The vocations are the life of a layperson in the world, either married or single, the ordained life of bishops, priests, and deacons, and consecrated religious life.

Process
Each diocese, religious institute, or monastery usually has its own guidelines and advice for men or women discerning religious vocations. Many dioceses and religious institutes encourage men and women with potential vocations to spend time, usually anywhere from six months to a year, praying and asking God to enlighten them. Those who feel they might be called to a religious vocation are encouraged to seek a spiritual director to help them along the way. After the set time, many institutes have a formal discernment process which the candidate will engage in, before entering the institute as a novice, or the seminary.

Men
For men there are a number of vocations in the Catholic Church. The best known is the vocation to the priesthood, as either a diocesan or a religious priest. A diocesan priest serves in a particular diocese and is under the local bishop.  A religious priest (in this sense) is a member of a specific religious institute such as the Trinitarians, Holy Cross Fathers and Brothers, Augustinians or Jesuits. Diocesan and religious priests may also serve for a time in specific apostolates such as military chaplains or the maritime apostolate.

In addition, men may be called to religious life as a non-ordained friar, monk, or a brother. Friars are members of mendicant orders, such the Franciscans or Augustinians. Monks are usually members of cloistered communities. Friars, monks, and religious Brothers all take vows of poverty, chastity, and obedience. Benedictine monks take a vow of stability, which is a commitment to their particular community. Members of societies of apostolic life, without taking religious vows, emphasize apostolic service and are fully active in society.

Other vocations for men in the Catholic Church include those to being permanent deacons, hermits, and consecrated members of a secular institute. It is possible for someone to experience a combination of vocations. Thomas Merton became a Trappist monk, was ordained a priest, and lived for a time in a hermitage on the monastery grounds. 

Since the Second Vatican Council, it has become more popular to consider committed single life, marriage, parenthood, and many other services as "lay" vocations, since each also requires a commitment to Christian faith and practice.

Women
For women, vocational discernment would consist of feeling called to marriage, the life of a religious sister or nun, a consecrated member of a Secular Institute, a hermit, or a Consecrated Virgin. The Catholic Church does not consider possible ordination of women to the priesthood.  Religious sisters are similar to active religious brothers. Nuns, in the strict sense of the word, correspond to monks.

As with men, it has become more popular since the Second Vatican Council to consider committed single life, marriage, parenthood, and many other services as "lay" vocations, since each also requires a commitment to Christian faith and practice.

Vocation to marriage
Traditionally the term vocation was used in the Catholic Church only to refer to priestly or religious vocations, the vocation to live a life directly consecrated to God.  Thomas Aquinas, e.g., only explicitly uses the term vocation to refer to vocation to grace or conversion, or to enter religious life, though it has been argued that his teaching may be logically extended to include marriage as a vocation. In the 20th century there has been a growing movement to extend the use of the term widely. The Second Vatican Council taught that  Christians, whatever their state, are called "to the fullness of the Christian life and to the perfection of charity". The conclusion drawn from this principle is that any way of life that can be a full expression of Christian charity, and a means for growing towards the perfection of it, can be a vocation. Pope John Paul II taught that "there are two specific ways of realizing the vocation of the human person, in its entirety, to love: marriage and virginity or celibacy".

See also

Catholic religious order
Institute of consecrated life
Secular clergy
Universal call to holiness

References

External links
VocationNetwork.org information about prayer, discernment, and Catholic religious vocations and institutes of consecrated life.
DigitalVocationGuide.org digital edition of VISION, the annual Catholic religious vocation discernment guide.
ReligiousLife.com, resources and vocation search from the Institute on Religious Life
CloisteredLife.com with information, photos, and community profiles of cloistered women's (and men's) communities
PriestVocation.com for men discerning a vocation to become a priest, brother, or Dominican friar.

Major orders in the Catholic Church
Catholic spirituality
Organisation of Catholic religious orders